The Council for Defence of Government Schools was an Australian political lobby group and political party formed in 1966, which contested federal and state elections between 1969 and 1973 (with one outlying appearance in 1985). The group was primarily concerned with public education but also focused on pensions and housing policy. The group was founded by activists opposed to state aid for private schools, and although it achieved some significant results it never elected a representative to an Australian legislature.

The organisation achieved some historical notoriety with their High Court case which argued unsuccessfully that Commonwealth funding of religious schools contravened section 116 of the Constitution. which is now used as an example of the powers granted to the Commonwealth under section 96 of the Constitution.

References

External links
 Official website

Defunct political parties in Australia
Political parties established in 1966
1966 establishments in Australia
Political parties with year of disestablishment missing